Taqa or TAQA may refer to:
Taqa, Iran, a village in Khuzestan Province, Iran
Taqah, town in Oman
Abu Dhabi National Energy Company (TAQA)
Training, Assessment and Quality Assurance (TAQA) in relation to adult, further and work-based educational assessment (in the UK)

See also
 Taka (disambiguation)
 TACA (disambiguation)
Tacca (disambiguation)